Michigan Madness were a USISL soccer club based in Ann Arbor, Michigan that played for two seasons. They began operations in 1995 as the Ann Arbor Elites and prior to the 1996 season, became the Madness. Before the 1997 season, the club folded.

See also 
USISL

Defunct soccer clubs in Michigan
USISL teams
1995 establishments in Michigan
1997 disestablishments in Michigan
Association football clubs established in 1995
Association football clubs disestablished in 1997
Sports in Ann Arbor, Michigan